Ioannis Karyofyllis can refer to:

 Ioannis Karyofyllis (athlete) (born 1908), Greek Olympic athlete
 Ioannis Karyofyllis (sailor) (born 1939), Greek Olympic sailor